Karol Kulczycki, SDS (born 19 October 1966) is a Polish-born Australian priest of the Catholic Church and a member of the Society of the Divine Savior.  He is the bishop of the Diocese of Port Pirie, having been appointed to the position in 2020.  He was first transferred in Australia in 1997, before returning to his home country in 2018.

Early life
Kulczycki was born in Góra, Poland, on 19 October 1966.  He joined the Society of the Divine Savior in 1987, and subsequently made his solemn vows in 1992.  On 28 May 1994, Kulczycki was ordained a priest in Poland by Cardinal Franciszek Macharski.

Presbyteral ministry
After ordination, Kulczycki's first assignment was at the Society's vocational office in his home country.  After three years there, he was sent to work in Australia as a chaplain, parochial vicar, and pastor.  He subsequently became provincial superior of the Salvatorians in Australia in 2010.  He returned to Poland in 2018 to serve as Vice Provincial.

Episcopal ministry
Kulczycki was appointed Bishop of Port Pirie on 1 August 2020. He was ordained bishop by Archbishop Adolfo Tito Yllana, Apostolic Nuncio to Australia on 29 September 2020 in Trzebinia, Poland, and will be installed in St Mark's Cathedral in Port Pirie on 28 October 2020.

References

External links

1966 births
20th-century Polish Roman Catholic priests

21st-century Roman Catholic bishops in Australia
Living people
People from Góra
Polish emigrants to Australia
Roman Catholic bishops of Port Pirie